Ben Brahim or bin Brahim is an Arabic patronymic literally meaning "son of Brahim (Ibrahim)". Notable people with this patronymic include:
Ali Fethi Ben Mohamed Ben Brahim Riahi, or Ali Riahi
Ahmed Ben Jaafar Ben Brahim Ibn Al Jazzar, or Ibn al-Jazzar
Driss Ben-Brahim
Mohamed Ben Brahim
Mohammed Ben Brahim
Mongi Ben Brahim
Muhammad Syamsul Ariffin bin Brahim (born 30 May 1983), Singaporean gang member of Salakau

See also